Ray Kelly is an Australian former professional tennis player.

Kelly, a Queenslander, was a two-time Australian Open boys' singles champion and was ranked as high as number two in the world junior rankings. He competed up until 1981 on the professional tour and reached a best singles ranking of 288 in the world. His career including appearances in the doubles main draw at Wimbledon.

From 2008 to 2010 he served as coach of the Hong Kong Davis Cup team.

References

External links
 
 

Year of birth missing (living people)
Living people
Australian male tennis players
Australian Open (tennis) junior champions
Grand Slam (tennis) champions in boys' singles
Grand Slam (tennis) champions in boys' doubles
Tennis people from Queensland